The WA89 experiment was a particle physics experiment performed in 1990s in the West Area of the SPS accelerator at CERN. It was a large acceptance forward spectrometer dedicated to the spectroscopy of charmed strange baryons and exotic multiquark states produced by a hyperon beam.

References

External Links 
CERN-WA-089 experiment record on INSPIRE-HEP

Particle experiments
CERN experiments